Verma is a village in Rauma Municipality in Møre og Romsdal county, Norway.  It is located along the European route E136 highway deep in the Romsdalen valley.  The village lies along the Rauma Line, where the Kylling Bridge crosses the Rauma River. The village is named after the local river Verma which empties into the main river Rauma.

The Øverdalen Church is located in Verma.

References

Rauma, Norway
Villages in Møre og Romsdal